Singil-dong is a dong, neighbourhood of Yeongdeungpo-gu in Seoul, South Korea.

See also 
Administrative divisions of South Korea

References

External links
Yeongdeungpo-gu official website
Yeongdeungpo-gu map at The Yeongdeungpo-gu official website
 Singil 1-dong resident office website

Neighbourhoods of Yeongdeungpo District